Grönåsen Älg- och Lantdjurspark ("Grönåsen Elk and Farm animal Park") is a Swedish zoo located in Kosta in Kronoberg County, Sweden, specialized in moose and display the rare white colored moose.

Zoos in Sweden
Tourist attractions in Kronoberg County
Zoos established in 1994
1994 establishments in Sweden